Juan Villegas is an Argentine film actor and director.

He won praise for his acting performance in the film El Perro (2004), and was nominated for an Argentine Film Critics Association Awards in 2004.

Villegas works in the cinema of Argentina.

Filmography
 Savage Roses (2002)  Locas 4 Life
 El Perro (2004) a.k.a. Bombón: El Perro
 El Camino de San Diego (2006) a.k.a. The Road to San Diego

Awards
Nominations
 Argentine Film Critics Association Awards: Silver Condor; Best New Actor, for: El Perro; (2004).

References

External links
 
 

Argentine male film actors
Living people
Year of birth missing (living people)
Place of birth missing (living people)